The 2013 African Volleyball Championship U21 will be held in Sidi Bou Said, Tunisia from 2 to 9 March 2013. The semi-finalists will qualify for the 2013 World Junior Championship.

Teams
The teams are.

Preliminary round

Pool A

|}

|}

Pool B

|}

|}

Classification round

9th place

|}

5–8th place bracket

Classification 5–8 places

|}

Seventh-place match

|}

Fifth-place match

|}

Final round

Semifinals

|}

Bronze-medal match

|}

Final

|}

Final standing

Team Roster
Taïeb Korbosli (L), Khaled Ben Slimene, Oussema Mrika, Montassar Ben Braham, Malek Chekir, Elyes Garfi, Adem Oueslati, Mohamed Amine Htira, Wassim Ben Tara, Mohamed Brahem, Sahbi Belkahla, Karim Mselmani
Head Coach: Fethi Mkaouar

Awards
MVP:  Malek Chekir
Best Spiker:  Aimable Mutuyimana
Best Blocker:  Mohamed Adel
Best Server:  Mohamed Brahim
Best Libero:  Tayeb Korbosli
Best Setter:  Amine Zayani
Best Receiver:  Reda Abdelmagid

References

External links
Official website

African Volleyball Championship U21
International volleyball competitions hosted by Tunisia
African Volleyball Championship U21
African Volleyball Championship U21